Democratic Force can refer to:

 Democratic Force (Costa Rica)
 Democratic Force (France)
 Democratic Force (Peru)
 Democratic Force (Romania)